Siphokazi Mani-Lusithi (born 19 July 1986) is a South African politician, currently a member of the Eastern Cape Provincial Legislature for the African National Congress, and the current Member of the Executive Council (MEC) responsible for Human Settlements in the Eastern Cape provincial government. Mani-Lusithi previously served as the MEC for Social Development.

Early life and education
Mani-Lusithi was born on 19 July 1986 in Steynsburg in the former Cape Province. She matriculated from Lawson Brown High School in Port Elizabeth in 2003. She studied at the University of Port Elizabeth and the University of Fort Hare. She is currently studying for a Bachelor of Administration degree from the University of South Africa.

Political career
Mani-Lusithi was involved in the African National Congress Youth League, the Young Communist League of South Africa, and student politics. She served as the provincial treasurer of the ANC youth league in the Eastern Cape and the provincial chairperson of the South African Student Congress. She was also a member of the National Executive Committee (NEC) of the Young Communist League of South Africa.

Mani-Lusithi worked as a provincial manager on conferencing and electoral matters in the ANC provincial office. She was also a coordinator of an ANC PEC sub-committee. Prior to her election to the provincial legislature, Mani-Lusithi was an HR practitioner at the ANC Caucus Office at the provincial legislature.

Provincial government
Mani-Lusithi was elected to the Eastern Cape Provincial Legislature in the 2019 Eastern Cape provincial election. She was then appointed Member of the Executive Council (MEC) for Social Development by the newly elected premier, Oscar Mabuyane. 

On 16 August 2022, Mani-Lusithi was appointed as the MEC for Human Settlements.

References

External links

Living people
1986 births
People from Walter Sisulu Local Municipality
Xhosa people
University of Fort Hare alumni
African National Congress politicians
Members of the Eastern Cape Provincial Legislature
Women members of provincial legislatures of South Africa